Cuts is collaborative studio album by the Japanese noise musician Merzbow, Hungarian drummer Balázs Pándi, and Swedish saxophonist Mats Gustafsson. It was recorded during a stop on the trio's East European tour in April 2012. The album was followed up in January 2015 by Live in Tabačka 13/04/12, which was recorded live the day before Cuts in Slovakia. Cuts of Guilt, Cuts Deeper, a studio album recorded with the addition of Thurston Moore, was released in March 2015.

The album was recorded in several improvised sessions at Metropolis Studio in Budapest, Hungary. Masami Akita then edited and mixed it at his Munemihouse studio in Tokyo, he didn't change the structure much except for moving a sax part. Pándi mixed his drums in Budapest. The track titles come from Leif Elggren's book Something like seeing in the dark.

Track listing

Personnel
All personnel credits adapted from the album notes.
Musicians
Masami Akita – noise electronics
Mats Gustafsson – baritone sax, G-clarinet, live electronics
Balázs Pándi – drums, percussion
 Technical and design personnel
Daniel Sandor – engineering
Gabor Borosi – engineering
James Plotkin – mastering
Péter Szabó – cover photos
Roki – cover art, design

Release history

References

External links

2013 albums
Collaborative albums
Free improvisation albums
Merzbow albums
RareNoiseRecords albums